Andor Technology Ltd is a developer and manufacturer of high performance light measuring solutions (scientific digital cameras). It became a subsidiary of Oxford Instruments after it was purchased for £176 million in December 2013. The company is based in Belfast, Northern Ireland and now employs over 400 staff across the group at its offices in Belfast, Japan, China, Switzerland and the US.

Andor Technology designs, manufactures and sells scientific imaging equipment including charge-coupled device (CCD), electron-multiplying CCD (EMCCD), scientific CMOS (sCMOS - an improved Active pixel sensor) and Intensified charge-coupled device camera systems, spectroscopy instrumentation, and microscopy systems.

Background 
Andor Technology was set up by its founders, Dr. Hugh Cormican, Dr. Donal Denvir and Mr. Mike Pringle  in the mid-1980s. While studying at Queen's University Belfast, they "used their physics know-how to build a highly sensitive digital camera...as a tool for their laser research." They subsequently set up Andor Technology to develop it into a commercial product for use in scientific research.

Andor Technology Ltd was established in 1989, as a spin out from Queen's University, Belfast. In December 2004 the company became a PLC when it listed on the Alternative Investment Market of the London Stock Exchange. Andor Technology PLC was delisted from the AIM stock market following purchase of all shares by Oxford Instruments in December 2013.

Products 
Andor introduced its first EMCCD camera, the DV 465 in 2001 and the company was awarded The Photonics Circle of Excellence Awards from Laurin Publishing, which recognizes the 25 Most Technically Innovative New Products of the Year.

EMCCD cameras are based on CCD chips that incorporate electron multiplication, or EMCCD technology.  They are used in fields such as drug discovery, where scientists need to watch vats of chemicals in real-time, astrophysics and oceanography.

In April 2020, Andor introduced the Marana 4.2B-6 back-illuminated scientific camera that provides up to -45 °C for 95% quantum performance and vacuum cooling. For dynamic imaging or spectroscopic applications, it offers up to 74 fps, such as wavefront sensing, lucky / speckle imaging, quantum gas dynamics, or hyperspectral imaging.

BC43, a compact benchtop confocal microscope, was launched in November 2021. The microscope is designed to be simple to use and is based around a Spinning Disk Confocal approach. It incorporates an sCMOS camera and a 4-line laser engine.

References

External links
Andor Technology Corporate website 
 Andor listing on the London Stock Exchange
Andor Technology's information site on EMCCD technology

Photography companies of the United Kingdom
Technology companies of the United Kingdom
Electronics companies of the United Kingdom
Companies of Northern Ireland
Companies based in Belfast
Photography in Northern Ireland
Research support companies
Brands of Northern Ireland